Kevin Zhu (born on November 27, 2000) is an American concert violinist. He is a recipient of the 2021 :Avery Fisher Career Grant and was the first prize winner of the 55th edition of the International Paganini Competition in Genoa, Italy, aged just 17. He was also the first prize winner in the junior division of the 2012 Yehudi Menuhin International Competition for Young Violinists in Beijing, China. In 2019, he made his debut at Carnegie Hall at Weill Recital Hall.

Biography 
Born in Maryland, USA, Kevin Zhu started playing violin at the age of 3. He attended elementary and middle schools in Cupertino, California. He was a pre-college student of Li Lin at the San Francisco Conservatory of Music. As a recipient of a Kovner Fellowship at The Juilliard School, Zhu is studying along with Itzhak Perlman and Li Lin.

Following his success at the Menuhin Competition and Paganini competition, Zhu has been a featured soloist with orchestras such as the Philharmonia Orchestra, the Vienna Chamber Orchestra, the Moscow Virtuosi Orchestra, the Pittsburgh Symphony Orchestra, and the China Philharmonic Orchestra. He also performs solo recitals across the United States, Italy, Germany, England, Poland, China, and Lebanon. Zhu has repeatedly been featured on BBC Radio 3 and NPR's From the Top. In 2021-2022, Zhu will perform on a multi-city tour of Italy and will perform a project that involves to play all of Paganini's 24 caprices in one concert.

Zhu currently performs on the 1722 ‘Lord Wandsworth’ Stradivarius violin — on long term loan to him from the Ryuji Ueno Foundation and the Rare Violins of New York "In Consortium".

Awards and appearances 

 Recipient of Kovner Fellowship, Juilliard School
2012: Junior Division First prize winner and Composer's prize winner at the Yehudi Menuhin International Competition for Young Violinists
 2018: First prize winner, at the Paganini International Violin Competition.
2018: Special prizes winner for the "Best performance of a Paganini Caprice" and for "Being the Youngest Finalist", at the Paganini International Violin Competition.
 2019: Carnegie Hall Debut at Weill Recital Hall
2021: Awarded a Lincoln Center for the Performing Arts Avery Fisher Career Grant
2021: Recipient of a Salon de Virtuosi Career Grant.

References

External links 
 Official Website

2000 births
Living people
American male violinists
San Francisco Conservatory of Music alumni
21st-century American violinists
21st-century American male musicians